Francis Xavier Mahoney (born 1929) is a Bermudian sprinter. He competed in the men's 100 metres at the 1948 Summer Olympics.

References

1929 births
Possibly living people
Athletes (track and field) at the 1948 Summer Olympics
Bermudian male sprinters
Olympic athletes of Bermuda
Place of birth missing (living people)